Sir Roland Giffard Oliver, MC (5 May 1882 – 14 March 1967) was an English barrister and High Court judge.

Biography

Early life and legal career 
Roland Oliver was the third son of Edmund Ward Oliver of Orlestone, Kent. He was educated at Marlborough College and Corpus Christi College, Oxford, where he obtained second-class honours in Jurisprudence. He was called to the Bar by the Inner Temple in 1909 and joined the South-Eastern Circuit. He was the pupil, and then the devil, of Travers Humphreys (later Mr Justice Humphreys) whose son, Christmas Humphreys, would later become Oliver's own pupil.

During the First World War, Oliver served with the Royal Field Artillery, and received the Military Cross. In 1921, he was appointed Third Junior Prosecuting Counsel for the Crown at the Central Criminal Court, and thereafter he took part in many notable criminal trials. These included the 1922 trial of Edith Thompson and Frederick Bywaters for murder, and the "Mr A." case, which arose out of the civil action Robinson v. Midland Bank.

In 1925, Oliver was appointed a King's Counsel and in 1934 he was elected a Bencher of the Inner Temple. Although his reputation was in criminal cases, after he took silk he began to be briefed in an increasing number of civil cases as well. In 1931, he unsuccessful defended William Herbert Wallace on a charge of murder, although the jury verdict was exceptionally quashed on appeal. In the 1933 "fire-rising" case, he led for the Crown in the prosecution of Leopold Harris, as well as the subsequent prosecution of Captain Brymore Eric Miles of the London Salvage Corps. In 1932, he appeared in the consistory court for the Bishop of Norwich in the action against the Rev. Harold Davidson, which led to his defrocking. In 1938, he successfully defended Dr. Aleck Bourne on a charge of abortion.

Oliver was Recorder of Folkestone from 1926 to 1938. In addition, he was a member of the 1936 inquiry into the leakage of the Budget, and chaired a committee on court martial procedure in 1938.

Judicial career 
In 1938, Oliver was appointed to the High Court of Justice in succession to Mr Justice Horridge. He was knighted upon his appointment and was assigned to the King's Bench Division. In 1943, he chaired an inquiry into the conditions in naval and military prisons and detention barracks. In 1948, he tried Peter Griffiths for the murder of June Anne Devaney. In 1951, he tried John Straffen, who was found to be unfit to plead. He retired in 1957, after a final sitting at the Old Bailey.

Family 
Oliver married Winifred Burnaby, third daughter of Lieutenant-Colonel Burnaby, in 1923; she died in 1959. Oliver then married Mrs. Madelaine Mary Kean in 1961; she died in 1974.

Assessment 
His obituary in The Times described him as "an outstanding figured at the criminal law Bar". He was described as having a quiet manner and a soft voice, but also "a strong and forceful character".

References 

 "Sir Roland Oliver", The Times, 16 March 1967, p. 16.
 Who Was Who

External links 

 

20th-century King's Counsel
1967 deaths
1882 births
People educated at Marlborough College
Alumni of Corpus Christi College, Oxford
Members of the Inner Temple
British Army personnel of World War I
Royal Field Artillery officers
Recipients of the Military Cross
English King's Counsel
Queen's Bench Division judges